Futsal Cartagena was a futsal club based in Cartagena, a city in the autonomous community of Region of Murcia.

The club was founded in 1993 and held its home matches in Wsell de Guimbarda, which has a capacity of 2,500 persons.

History
Fútbol Sala Cartagena was founded in 1993 as Mínguez Sáez Cartagena.

Peinsa sponsorship fall
The club was sponsored for Peinsa until January, 2009. Peinsa was a company dedicated to housings promotions that in January went bankrupt. Due to this, the company was forced to leave as the sponsorship of Futsal Cartagena. In February, the club signed a new sponsorship contract with Centro Médico Virgen de la Caridad, a private health center from Cartagena, for ensure the future of club.

In mid of July, Futsal Cartagena sign a new sponsorship contract with Reale, an Italian insurance company.

The club was disbanded in July 2014 due to large debts incurred from past seasons. A new futsal team was created in the city, Cartagena Fútbol Sala, taking the FS Cartagena spot in Segunda División.

Season to season

14 seasons in Primera División
5 seasons in Segunda División
2 seasons in Segunda División B

Current squad

Notable players
 Jordi Torras
 Sergio Lozano
 Cristian Domínguez
 Manoel Tobias
 Leandro Simi
 Lenísio
 Franklin Roosevelt
 Rafael França
 Ciço

References

External links
Official website
Profile at LNFS.es

 
1993 establishments in Murcia (region)
2014 disestablishments in Murcia (region)
Futsal clubs in Spain
Futsal clubs established in 1993
Sports clubs disestablished in 2014
Sports teams in the Region of Murcia
Sport in Cartagena, Spain